Francisca da Silva de Oliveira  (–1796), known in history by the name Chica da Silva and whose romanticized version/character is also known by the spelling Xica da Silva, was a Brazilian woman who became famous for becoming rich and powerful despite having been born into slavery. Her life has been a source of inspiration for many works in television, films, music, theater and literature. She is popularly known as the slave who became a queen. The myth of Chica da Silva is often conflated with the historical accounts of Francisca da Silva de Oliveira.

Biography

Francisca da Silva de Oliveira was a parda woman born in Vila do Príncipe (nowadays Serro), in the north of the state of Minas Gerais, in Brazil between 1730 and 1735.  Not unlike many other regions in Brazil, this region's population was slaves outnumbering whites by a large margin. People in the town made a living either through gold or diamond mining. Francisca lived mainly in Arraial do Tijuco (nowadays known as Diamantina) and was the daughter of a Portuguese man, Antônio Caetano de Sá and an enslaved African woman, Maria da Costa, who was probably from the Gulf of Guinea or Bahia. The region of Minas Gerais was unique in that it had a fairly diverse population in comparison to other slave regions on the Brazilian coast, Caribbean, and the United States.

Known as "Francisca parda" while enslaved, Francisca's first owner was Domingos da Costa, who was from Milho Verde. After Costa, Francisca was sold to Sergeant Manuel Pires Sardinha, with whom she had her first son, Simão Pires Sardinha. Although Sardinha listed Simão as one of his heirs, Sardinha never officially declared paternity of Simão. Francisca's third master was João Fernandes de Oliveira, a diamond mine owner and mining Governor of Arraial do Tijuco, one of the richest persons of Colonial Brazil. Because Francisca later added "da Silva" as a surname, it is often incorrectly concluded that she was once owned by a José da Silva de Olivera. The name, however, was very common among the Portuguese at the time and offered a fresh start.

Sources suggest that Francisca was granted her freedom, either by José da Silva de Oliveira at the request of João Fernandes or that she was given her freedom directly by João Fernandes when he bought her from Pires Sardinha in 1753. After being granted her freedom, Chica officially changed her name to Francisca da Silva de Oliveira in order to erase her history as a slave. This was hugely beneficial for her son Simão Pires Sardinia who later in life was able hide his mothers slave ancestry and his status of being an illegitimate son in order to receive the prestigious Portuguese title knight of the Order of Christ.

Francisca and João soon started a relationship. Despite not being officially married, they lived together for several years and had 13 children: Francisca de Paula (1755); João Fernandes (1756); Rita (1757); Joaquim (1759); Antonio Caetano (1761); Ana (1762); Helena (1763); Luiza (1764); Antônia (1765); Maria (1766); Quitéria Rita (1767); Mariana (1769); José Agostinho Fernandes (1770). Soon after, Chica became an independent owner of a house in Tejuco on Opera Street. The house was adorned with many luxuries including an extensive garden, her own personal chapel, and furniture like bathtubs, armoires, mirrors and canopy beds, that were rare to households at the time. Chica was also the owner of many slaves who both helped her in the house and worked in the mines in the region. Chica also presented herself in a very ostentatious manner in order to help differentiate herself from the other mixed people in society. People often showed their status through their material items, which for Chica included her clothing, home, slaves, and change in name. By the end of her life she also included Dona at the beginning of her name for a more prestigious title.

In 1770, João Fernandes had to return to Portugal and took along with him the four sons he had with Chica as well as Chica's two other sons Placid Pires Sardinha and Simão Pires Sardinha, who were granted noble titles by the Portuguese court. Their daughters remained with Chica in Brazil and were sent to the then-renowned Convent of Macaúbas. Even after the departure of João to Portugal, Chica retained her prestige. She was a member of the São Francisco do Carmo Brotherhood (exclusive to whites), Mercês Brotherhood (exclusive to mulattos) and the Rosário Brotherhood (exclusive to Africans).

Chica da Silva died in 1796. She was buried at the Church of São Francisco de Assis, a privilege that only wealthy whites enjoyed.

Gender in Colonial Brazil

In eighteenth century Brazil, colonizers and slaves were both overwhelmingly male. Portuguese men had traveled to Brazil alone to seek wealth, as Portuguese women were often banned from migrating. In part due to love affairs and children born between Portuguese men and African and/or mulatta slave women, freed former slaves were predominately female. Stereotypes about non-white women were abundant during the colonial period and while gender, race and color worked together to systemically disadvantage negro women, some individuals—such as Chica—used their perceived hyper-sensuality to invert gender and power relations. Once socially mobile, these women were seen as even more dominant than their masters.

The myth

Chica's legacy was often misused to symbolize Brazil's so called "racial democracy." Currently, however, scholars maintain that she used miscegenation and her connections as a tool to achieve a higher social status, as did other African Brazilians at the time. Historian Júnia Ferreira Furtado sustains that concubinage and marriage between white male and black female in colonial Brazilian society was a way found by the enslaved to change their social position. 

João Fernandes and Chica da Silva's relationship was a scandal in colonial Brazilian society. Chica da Silva, formerly enslaved, had become one of the most powerful women in colonial America. Chica was banished from the parish church, which was reserved for Caucasians only. To show the locals Chica's power, João Fernandes built a luxurious church attended just by herself. However, as Furtado discloses, Chica attended brotherhoods exclusive to whites, as a way to try to fit into the status quo and be aware of its schemes against her and her people.

Contrary to what was propagated, Chica also owned slaves, and is only known to have freed one of them. Historians view this as the main difference between the experience of Africans in Brazil and their counterparts in the United States. While in the US, African-American former slaves had a more unified movement, in Brazil they tried to integrate into white society as mixed-race people saw that "whitening" themselves was a way to escape from their slave past.  Although slaves didn't have any choice if the master or mistress decided to use them as sex objects, some were able to use the situation, especially in regard to their offspring who were part European. The colonial Portuguese mentality was also more tolerant than the US Anglo-Saxon one on race when it had to do with their mixed-race offspring. Whereas Anglo-Saxon slave holders forced their own race-mixed offspring into slavery and sold them to other masters as well, making a profit from them, Luso-Brazilians generally freed  their own mixed-race children and often granted them nobility titles. This happened perhaps because of the lack of Portuguese women that migrated to Brazil.

Works
Xica da Silva (movie): a film released in 1976, by Cacá Diegues, starring Zezé Motta as Chica da Silva.
Xica da Silva (telenovela): a telenovela released in 1996, written by Walcyr Carrasco and directed by Walter Avancini. It has been successful in several countries around the world. Starring as Xica da Silva, the actress Taís Araújo was the first black Brazilian to be the protagonist of a soap-opera. She is still the only black actress to be the protagonist of a telenovela on Brazilian TV History. She also played a protagonist again in Rede Globo's Da Cor do Pecado.
Xica da Silva, a song by Jorge Ben on his 1976 album África Brasil
Chica da Silva. a song by Boney M from the 1985 album Eye Dance

References

Further reading
Ferreira Furtado, Júnia. Chica da Silva e o contratador de diamantes: o outro lado do mito, (São Paulo: Companhia das Letras, 2003).
Ferreira Furtado, Júnia. Chica da Silva: A Brazilian Slave of the Eighteenth Century'' (Cambridge University Press, 2009). (Translation of Chica da Silva e o contratador de diamantes.

External links
  Xica da Silva
  Filha da Dúvida, Jornal O Estado de Minas

Brazilian people of Beninese descent
Brazilian people of Portuguese descent
1732 births
1796 deaths
Brazilian slaves
18th-century Brazilian people
Portuguese slave owners
Métis people
18th-century slaves
18th-century Brazilian women
Free people of color
Women slave owners